Udea litorea is a moth of the family Crambidae. It is endemic to the Hawaiian islands of Oahu and Lanai.

The larvae feed on Scaevola frutescens.

External links

Moths described in 1883
Endemic moths of Hawaii
litorea